Faulkner Branch is a  long second-order tributary to Marshyhope Creek in Caroline County, Maryland.

Variant names
According to the Geographic Names Information System, it has also been known historically as: 
Faulkners Branch

Course

Watershed
Faulkner Branch drains  of area, receives about 44.5 in/year of precipitation, and is about 6.53% forested.

See also
List of Maryland rivers

References

Rivers of Maryland
Rivers of Caroline County, Maryland
Tributaries of the Nanticoke River